TF1 (standing for Télévision Française 1) is a French commercial television network owned by TF1 Group, controlled by the Bouygues conglomerate. TF1's average market share of 24% makes it the most popular domestic network.

TF1 is part of the TF1 Group of mass media companies, which also includes the news channel LCI. It previously owned the satellite TV provider TPS, which was sold to Canal+ Group.

The network is a supporter of the Hybrid Broadcast Broadband TV (HBBTV) initiative promoting and establishing an open European standard for hybrid set-top boxes for the reception of terrestrial TV and broadband multimedia applications with a single user interface.

On 20 May 2021, it was announced that TF1 Group, owners of the channel, proposed a merger with Groupe M6, which owns M6. On September 16, 2022, it was announced that the merger was officially abandoned.

History 
It was the only television channel in France for 28 years, and has changed its name numerous times since the creation of Radio-PTT Vision on 26 April 1935, making it one of the oldest television stations in the world, and one of the very few prewar television stations to remain in existence to the present day. It became Radiodiffusion nationale Télévision (RN Télévision) in 1937, Fernsehsender Paris (Paris Television) during German occupation in 1943, RDF Télévision française in 1944, RTF Télévision in 1949, la Première chaîne de la RTF in 1963 following the creation of the second channel, la Première chaîne de l'ORTF in 1964 and finally, Télévision Française 1 (TF1) in 1975.

Radio-PTT Vision (1935–1937) 
The first public demonstration of a 30-line mechanical television took place on April 14, 1931. The image rendering was an improvement upon Baird's thanks to the development of the "moving light point" system and the use of a camera with Weiller mirror drums by the engineer René Barthélemy, head of the radio laboratory of the Compagnie desmètres (CdC) of Montrouge. In charge of French broadcasting, the PTT administration carried out some rudimentary television experiments from December 1931 by broadcasting experimental 30 to 45 minute broadcasts at variable times from Monday to Saturday with Baird equipment from the medium wave transmitter of Radio PTT. The Barthélemy system was officially adopted in preference to that of Baird, due to the greater stability of the images, for the continuation of experimental emissions in 1932.

The Minister of the PTT, Henri Queuille, then authorised the CdC to continue its experiments using the PTT superior school transmitter located at 103 rue de Grenelle and assigned the company a rudimentary studio at number 93 of the same street. Barthélemy continued his experiments there with a new disc camera from Nipkow which offered much better shooting possibilities than with the previous system. The programs were broadcast in 30 lines on Tuesday and Friday at 5:00 pm by two transmitters, the images by the medium wave transmitter of the higher school of the PTT on the wavelength of 431 meters and the sound by the transmitter of the CdC in Montrouge connected to the studio by a telephone line. These experimental broadcasts only reached a very limited public of amateurs of technical innovation who tinkered with receivers connected to a radio, thus constituting a radiovision receiver.

At the same time, the BBC Television Service had been broadcasting an experimental but regular television service since 22 August 1932, with broadcasts taking place Monday to Friday from 11.00 a.m. to 11.30 a.m., and at night on medium wave on 205 meters at times when BBC radio programmes closed down. The new French Minister of the PTT of the Flandin Government, Georges Mandel, during a visit to the general manager of the British Broadcasting Corporation at the end of 1934, attended a live broadcast of the Derby of Epsom on a Televisor put in the item by John Logie Baird.

Convinced by this demonstration and of the interest of this invention for the future, but also very aware that the ministerial instability must lead him to quickly imprint his mark on the heavy administration of the PTT for which he was responsible by modernizing, Georges Mandel decided to inaugurate as soon as possible a regular and experimental public television service in France. In March 1935, he went to the CdC to measure the state of progress of the research. René Barthélemy gave him a demonstration of his new mechanical disc camera with 60 lines of definition (25 images per second), his new telecine (of which he was the inventor) with 180 lines, as well as a receiver with 60 cathode ray tube lines; a tube for which the CdC has just launched production. He also informed him of his ongoing work on a 180-line camera.

Pressed to carry out his project, the minister granted Barthélemy the means requested for his success. The amphitheater of the PTT higher school, located in the premises of the Ministry of Posts and Telecommunications at 103 rue de Grenelle, was converted into a television studio on April 17, 1935 and its bleachers were dismantled to enlarge it. The CdC's 60-line mechanical camera is placed in the adjoining room, behind double-thick insulating glass to mask the sound of the motor spinning the camera disk. This same room also housed the 60-line, 500-watt transmitter designed by the Compagnie des Comptes. The project provided for a short wave transmitter on the Eiffel Tower and a definition of 180 lines in the long term, as soon as Barthélemy had finalized his work.

One thousand guests of the Minister, personalities, journalists and industrialists flocked to the studio at 103 rue de Grenelle on Friday, April 26, 1935 to attend the first official regular French television broadcast transmitted by radio with a definition of 60 lines3. It is 8:15 pm when, on the small greenish screen, appears the face of the actress and friend of the minister, Béatrice Bretty, member of the Comédie-Française, with at her side, Jean Toscane, the most famous voice of Radio PTT, and René Barthélemy. Lips and eyes made up in black for the needs of television broadcasting, Miss Bretty recounted of her last tour in Italy with the troupe: “We had a great trip...”. These were the first words broadcast on French television. This first television program was broadcast live until 8:30pm on the 175-meter medium-wave frequency within a radius of 100 km. Radiovision-PTT, the first French television channel, had just been born.

Radio-PTT Vision began operations on 26 April 1935 as the first television station in France, using a 30-line mechanical television system based on the Nipkow disk. It was operated by the French PTT agency with a transmitter located atop the Eiffel Tower, and was on air three days a week from 11 am to 11:30 am and 8 pm to 8:30 pm and on Sundays from 5:30 pm to 7:30 pm. On 4 January 1937, the broadcasting hours were changed such that television programmes were aired from 5 pm until 10 pm on Wednesdays to Fridays, and from 4 pm to 8:30 pm or 9 pm on Saturdays to Tuesdays.

Impressed by the sharpness of the 60-line images obtained from the cathode-ray tube control receiver during this broadcast, Georges Mandel gave the PTT technicians and René Barthélemy six months to set up the necessary installations for regular public broadcasting in 180 lines. Two months late, the official inauguration of 180-line television took place on Sunday, December 8, 1935, from 5:30pm to 7:30pm in front of the press, at the Radiovision-PTT studio at 103, rue de Grenelle in Paris, with a gala session combining excerpts from plays, comic operas, poems, songs and sketches performed by many famous comedians and music-hall artists invited by Béatrice Bretty, and whose numbers were announced at the screen by Suzy Wincker, the first official continuity announcer, on the air since June.

The rue de Grenelle studio required 50,000 lux of light to compensate for the insufficient sensitivity of the 180-line mechanical camera with a double-spiral Nipkow disc rotating at 50 rotations per second. The dissipation of the heat of this very violent lighting was annoying and even dangerous for the artists. This is why a forced-air refrigeration system (temperature and humidity) was installed in the studio to lower its temperature from 55 to 25 °C by means of six aerators. The images filmed in the studio were routed live by a 2,500 meter long telephone cable to a new transmitter designed by SFR-CSF and temporarily located at the north pillar of the Eiffel Tower, from where a feeder connected it to the four 2 kW shortwave transmitting antennas located at the top of the tower 320 meters high and which can be received 100 km around Paris11. The sound was transmitted in medium wave on the frequency of 206 meters by the transmitter of Radio Tour Eiffel.

The very large public crowds in front of the receivers installed at the National Conservatory of Arts and Crafts at 292 rue Saint-Martin, at the National Tourist Office of the Champs-Elysées, at the Salon de la France d'Outre-Mer at the Grand Palais, at the Maison de la Chimie, and at the town hall of the 5th arrondissement of Paris, which simultaneously broadcast the images in 180 lines. Indeed, if Barthélemy's Emyvisor was put on sale at the end of 1935, its price was still exorbitant (8,000 to 10,000 francs at the time, or around 6,000 euros today) and only the privileged few could enjoy television at the time.

Robert Jardillier, new PTT Minister of the Popular Front, launched on October 24, 1936 a call for tenders from radio-electric manufacturers in order to provide television with higher definition equipment exploiting the possibilities offered by the iconoscope and electronic television. Already exploited by the British, Germans and Americans. A test period would enable the best standard to be chosen.

The broadcasts became regular from January 4, 1937 with broadcast from 11am to 11:30am and from 8pm to 8:30pm on weekdays and from 5:30pm to 7:30pm on Sundays. The Deputy Secretary General for Broadcasts, Wladimir Porché, brought the greatest French artists, such as Sacha Guitry, Serge Lifar and Maurice Chevalier, to the cameras of the Radiovision-PTT studio. At that time, there were only about 100 individual television receivers.

Grammont carried out its tests in 441 lines, the Compagnie Française de Télévision (association of the CdC and SFR-CSF) in 450 lines and Thomson-Houston in 455 lines. The PTT administration chose the 455-line high-definition equipment manufactured by Thomson for public demonstrations at the 1937 Paris International Arts and Techniques Exhibition, which was then transferred to the Radiovision-PTT studio for testing.

Radiodiffusion nationale Télévision (1937–1939) 
Following successful trials of a "high-definition" 455-line electronic television system designed by Thomson-Houston which improved on the 405-line system originally designed by EMI-Marconi, Radio-PTT Vision renamed itself as Radiodiffusion nationale Télévision (RN Télévision) in July 1937. However, broadcasts using the Nipkow disk system continued alongside the new electronic system until 10 April 1938. In July 1938, a decree of the French PTT agency fixed the French terrestrial television standard as transmitting on 455 lines VHF (46 MHz, positive modulation, 25 frames per second), to be adopted throughout France within three years. The adoption of the electronic standard marked the end of mechanical television in France, and the advent of electronic television to obtain much better image quality.

While the BBC Television Service broadcast the arrival of the President of the French Republic Albert Lebrun at London station for his official visit on March 21, 1939, without the National Broadcasting Television being able to film a single image, the Minister of the PTT Alfred Jules-Julien promises on March 31 a bus equipped for remote reporting in the open air within two weeks, a new television studio and programs broadcast in the evening after dinner.

The administrative system of public broadcasting was modified by a decree of July 29, 1939 signed by the President of the Council Édouard Daladier, making French Broadcasting, and therefore the television service attached to it, a State monopoly which ceased to depend on the Ministry of PTT to pass under the administration of the National French Radio, newly created for this purpose, endowed with an autonomous budget and placed directly under the authority of the President of the Council.

The rue de Grenelle studio went on annual vacation on July 31, 1939 and never reopened. Radiodiffusion nationale Télévision then only broadcast films, documentaries and news via its Grammont telecine and identified itself with the callsign Télé-Cinéma Radiodiffusion nationale1. When France entered the war on Sunday, September 3, 1939 at 5 p.m., the military authorities ordered the cessation of broadcasts and took control of the Eiffel Tower transmitter. The French hardly notice it because there are no more than 300 receiving stations throughout the territory, which are also watched in a few rare public places. A few broadcasts were still broadcast episodically for transmitter maintenance purposes, but these were not advertised in the press so that the Germans could not use the transmitter signal to locate and bombard Paris. On June 6, 1940, technicians from the National Broadcasting Company sabotaged the transmitter to make it unusable by the Germans who were at the gates of Paris.

Fernsehsender Paris (1943–1944) 
The occupier initially took no interest in the Eiffel Tower transmitter until an order in May 1941, aimed at reducing transmission sites in the occupied zone in order to recover raw materials, and thus recover certain elements of the French 455-line transmitter of interest to Telefunken leads to discussions on the rehabilitation and use of this transmitter for television. Opposed to this dismantling, the officer Kurt Hinzmann, former director of the programs of Berlin's Paul Nipkow television stations, who succeeded in convincing the German authorities to continue the broadcast of the programs of the station during the war by proposing its use to distract the war wounded in hospitals, takes up this idea to apply it to the French capital and thus save the Parisian transmitter. He recommends putting the Eiffel Tower transmitter back into service to broadcast a television channel intended to entertain the German soldiers hospitalized in the Kriegslazaretts in Paris. In addition, this television channel would open up the French market to the German electrical industry by adopting the German 441-line broadcasting standard developed by Telefunken. Finally, from a military point of view, the repair of this transmitter could allow it to be used as a jammer for enemy planes.

By order of the Oberkommando der Wehrmacht to the Ministry of PTT on May 20, 1942, the work to restore the transmitter in the Eiffel Tower to service was entrusted to the Compagnie des comptes de Montrouge and the German firm Telefunken, following of a collaboration agreement between the two companies to jointly build the technical infrastructure of this new television channel. The equipment of the Compagnie des Compteurs being considered uninteresting, Telefunken supplied the new television transmitter to the German standard of 441 lines, recovered from the Reichspost in Germany, and which was installed by technicians from Berlin.

Fernsehsender Paris (Paris-Télévision) moved into a large 3,000-seat ballroom, a remnant of the former Magic-City amusement park closed in 1926, unused since the start of the war. This installation made it possible to start the programs on a regular basis on May 7, 1943 only in telecine, because the work on the V-shaped stage, allowing the cameras to be moved back for wider shots, had not been completed. It broadcasts in German and French four days a week from 10 am to noon, three days from 3pm to 8pm and every evening from 8:30pm to 10pm, broadcasting variety shows and theater for field hospitals (Kriegslazarett) of the Wehrmacht installed in the Paris region and German residents in Paris (about 1,000 receivers, including a hundred for French viewers). The station was officially inaugurated on September 30, 1943 with the start of live broadcasts.

A week before the liberation of Paris, Fernsehsender Paris definitively interrupted its programs on Saturday August 12, 1944 at 11:30 p.m. abandoned. On August 17, the order was given to Hinzmann to blow up the Eiffel Tower's transmitter, which he refused, contenting himself with firing a few symbolic shots into unimportant equipment. The Germans left the studios, leaving the French with a fully operational and among the most efficient television station in the world, which enabled French television to be the first in Europe to resume its broadcasts from the old studio and with the equipment from Fernsehsender Paris, from October 1, 1944 intermittently and in closed circuit, because the Americans prohibited the use of the Eiffel Tower transmitter until October 1, 1945.

RDF Télévision française (1944–1949) 
Television broadcasts in France resumed on 1 October 1944 under the name Télévision française, and following the creation of Radiodiffusion française on 23 March 1945, the television service was renamed as RDF Télévision française. Following the return of the Eiffel Tower to the French after being in American administration following the liberation of Paris on 1 October 1945, the official resumption of television broadcasts took place with one hour of programming each day. On 20 November 1948, the Secretary of State for Information, François Mitterrand, decreed the adoption of the 819-line high-definition VHF standard, which was in use from 1949 until 1983.

RTF Télévision (1949–1964) 

Radiodiffusion française was renamed as Radiodiffusion-télévision française (RTF) on 9 February 1949, and thus began the growth of television as an accepted mass medium in France. On 29 May 1949, the first news programme aired on RTF TV, and on 30 July 1949 a television licence fee was introduced. Residents living outside Paris could view RTF TV for the first time in February 1952 when Télé Lille (now known as France 3 Nord-Pas-de-Calais), a regional broadcaster operating since 10 April 1950, was co-opted into the RTF TV network and became RTF's first relay outside Paris.

Première chaîne de l'ORTF (1964–1975) 
Following the creation of RTF Télévision 2 (now France 2) in 1963, the first channel was renamed as Première chaîne de la RTF (First Channel of the RTF), which was renamed as Première chaîne de l'ORTF (First Channel of the ORTF) when the ORTF was created on 25 July 1964. This period marked the introduction of commercial advertising on Première chaîne de l'ORTF which began on 1 October 1968. On 8 January 1969, the ORTF created a subsidiary company called Régie française de publicité (RFP) to handle all advertising on the ORTF channels.

TF1 (since 1975) 
TF1 (which originally stood for Télévision Française 1 (French Television 1)) was created on 1 January 1975 when law 74-696 7 August 1974 (which split the ORTF into 7 organisations) came into effect, and the rebranding from Première chaîne de l'ORTF to TF1 came into effect on 6 January 1975. A new multicoloured logo for TF1 created by Catherine Chaillet came out that same year along with cel-animated idents, and from 1976 until 1985, analogue computer-generated idents produced using the Scanimate system were used on TF1, created by the American company Robert Abel and Associates with background music composed by Vladimir Cosma. The 1975 TF1 logo was later modified in 1984 and again in 1987. Colour television was first introduced to TF1 on 1 September 1975 when FR3 (now France 3) agreed to supply some of its colour programming to TF1, and the conversion to colour on TF1 was completed in 1977, though the old 819-line analogue network remained entirely black-and-white until it was decommissioned in 1983. Since TF1's privatisation in April 1987, the abbreviation is no longer expanded, so as to avoid confusion with the government-owned television broadcaster France Télévisions And In April 1987 TF1 Droped Régie Française de Publicité.

From 1984 to 1986, the French television landscape evolved significantly with the launch of three new television channels: Canal+, La Cinq and TV6. In March 1986, the Chirac government decided to privatize one of the three public channels. TF1 was selected on May 14 even though initial reports suggested  Antenne 2. The channel was therefore more apt to confront with competition, but still considered left-leaning for the right-wing majority.

TF1's current logo was unveiled on 2 February 1990, replacing the old logo and in 1993 the Régie française de publicité was liquidated . The channel was also broadcast in Italy alongside La Chaîne Info on digital terrestrial television from 2004 to December 2006 on Dfree multiplex. In 2005, TF1 launched TF1Vision, a video on demand service.

Since October 2022, TF1, as well as the free DTT channels of the TF1 group, have been accessible free to air, via the Astra 1 satellite. This broadcast follows a temporary interruption in encrypted broadcasting to Canal+ and TNTSAT subscribers. , following a commercial dispute. However, despite the resumption of encrypted broadcasts within the Canal+ and TNTSAT bouquets, this free-to-air broadcasting continues. LCI is therefore received free of charge in almost all of Continental Europe.

Logo history

Programmes

General 
Le Journal at 13:00 and 20:00 – most broadcast TV news of Europe.
Qui veut gagner des millions?
Ninja Warrior
The Voice
Koh-Lanta
Demain Nous Appartient ( Tomorrow is Ours) and Ici Tout Commence 
Section de Recherches
Mask Singer
Danse avec les stars (Strictly Come Dancing)
Vendredi tout est permis

Children's television series 
 Abby Hatcher
 The Big Comfy Couch (Le Monde de Loonette)
 Gazoon
 Kikoumba: Crown Down
 Marcus Level
 Miraculous: Tales of Ladybug & Cat Noir 
 PAW Patrol (Paw Patrol, La pat'trouille)
 Super Wings
 The Smurfs (Les Schtroumpfs)
 The Toy Castle (Le Château magique)
 Totally Spies!

Sports

Multi-sporting events 
 Olympic Games
 Paralympic Games

Association football 
 FIFA
FIFA Men's World Cup
 Finals (selected matches (including all France team matches (if qualified)), co-licensed with beIN Sports)
 Qualifiers (up to five France matches only (other France matches live on M6), other matches not involving France team live on TFX, TMC, W9 and L'Equipe)
 FIFA Women's World Cup (selected matches at the finals tournament only, co-licensed with Canal+)
 UEFA
Men's
UEFA European Championship
Finals (selected matches, shared with M6 and co-licensed with beIN Sports)
Qualifiers (four first pick France matches only, in September 2019 aired a second pick (four second pick and one first pick live on M6), other matches not involving France live on TFX, TMC, W9 , and L'Equipe)
UEFA Nations League (France away matches only in 2018–19 (home matches live on M6), other matches not involving France live on TFX-TMC-W9 (including Finals) and L'Equipe (group stage only))
UEFA Champions League (final only, returned again in 2019–20 until 2023–24, licensed from RMC Sport (2020 and 2021) and Canal+-beIN Sports (2022 until 2024))
Women's
UEFA European Championship (selected matches at the finals tournament only, co-licensed with Canal+)
 France national football team (selected Nations League, qualifiers, and friendlies, other matches live on M6, in 2019 one friendly match live on TMC

Rugby 
 Rugby World Cup (shared with TMC in 2019)

Handball 
 IHF Men's and Women's World Championships (France matches at the finals tournament only (if qualified) until 2025, licensed from beIN Sports)
 EHF Men's and Women's European Championships (France matches at the finals tournament only (if qualified) until 2024, licensed from beIN Sports)

Gridiron football 
 National Football League (Super Bowl only from 2019, licensed from beIN Sports)

Motorsport 
 Formula One (three races only (including French GP) until 2020 with Monaco GP live on TMC, licensed from Canal+)

Ice hockey 
 Ice Hockey World Championships – Canal+ some matches on TMC and M6

Criticism 
Some commentators accuse TF1 of being an excessively populist, commercialised channel. There is a clear emphasis on "light" entertainment programmes over more serious content, and the channel's success is sometimes seen as being founded on the ménagères de moins de 50 ans (housewives under 50) audience segment. A large proportion of the schedule consists of gameshows, sensational documentaries and dubbed versions of TV series. The channel's news service is perceived as consisting of more celebrity news and human-interest stories than its public-sector competitors.

On 16 April 2009, the employee responsible for the "Web innovation" department was fired for criticizing the HADOPI law in a private email (on 19 February) sent to a Member of Parliament. The management of TF1 was notified about the e-mail by the Ministry for Culture and Communication, whose Minister Christine Albanel is also one of the authors of the HADOPI law.

In 2004, Patrick Le Lay, CEO of TF1 made the following statement about the channel's aims:
There are many ways to speak about TV, but in a business perspective, let's be realistic: at the basis, TF1's job is helping Coca-Cola, for example, to sell its product. What we sell to Coca-Cola is available human brain time. Nothing is more difficult than obtaining this availability. This is where permanent change is located. We must always look out for popular programs, follow trends, surf on tendencies, in a context in which information is speeding up, getting manifold and trivialized.

Critics of TF1 also contend that its news coverage is slanted towards supporting right-wing politicians – they were in particular accused of supporting Édouard Balladur in the 1995 presidential elections, and of overstating crime during the 2002 electoral campaign to tilt the balance in favour of former French president Jacques Chirac, who campaigned on a law and order platform.

Key figures within TF1 are close friends to some of the most powerful politicians in France, and the relationship between Bouygues and the public-sector contracting system often raises suspicions. Immigration and violence are arguably conflated in the channel's news programmes. In addition, it is occasionally alleged that news reports from TF1 tend to ignore issues yielding a bad light on their parent group (Bouygues), while stressing the problems of competitors (such as Vinci SA).

Such criticism was heavy in the satirical show Les Guignols de l'info, broadcast on rival network Canal+. However, TF1 now competes in this category with M6, which was initially a generalist channel focusing on musical programmes, but now has programming more resembling TF1 (notably, reality shows that TF1 started running just after M6 introduced them).

See also 
List of television stations in France
TF1 Tower

References

External links 
 Official Site 

Bouygues
Video on demand
European Broadcasting Union members
Television channels and stations established in 1935
Television stations in France
French-language television stations
Former state media
Privatized companies of France